{{Infobox alpine ski racer
|name          = Thomas Fanara
|image         = Portrait Ski FANARA.jpg
|image_size    = 210
|caption       = Fanara, c. 2009
|disciplines   = Giant slalom
|club          = Douanes – C.S. Praz-sur-Arly
|birth_date    = 
|birth_place   = Annecy, Haute-Savoie, France
|death_date    = 
|death_place   = 
|height        = 170 cm
|wcdebut       = 11 January 2005 (age 23)
|retired       = 16 March 2019 (age 37)
|website       = 
|olympicteams  = 3 – (2006, 2014, 2018) 
|olympicmedals = 0
|olympicgolds  = 
|worldsteams   = 6 – (2007–15, 2019)|worldsmedals  = 1 (1 gold)
|worldsgolds   = 
|wcseasons     = 15 – (2005–2019)
|wcwins        = 1 – (1 GS) 
|wcpodiums     = 14 – (14 GS) 
|wcoveralls    = 0 – (23rd in 2016)|wctitles      = 0 – (4th in GS, 2014)|medals        = 

|show-medals   = yes
}}

Thomas Fanara (born 24 April 1981) is a former French World Cup alpine ski racer.

Born in Annecy, Haute-Savoie, Fanara specialised in giant slalom; his one and only win came in March 2016 at the giant slalom finals in St. Moritz, Switzerland. He is the oldest racer to reach a World Cup podium in giant slalom, and competed for France at three Winter Olympics and six World Championships. He retired from competition at the end of the 2018-19 season.

World Cup
Fanara has started over 70 World cup races, mostly in giant slalom but also in slalom, and has been on the podium fourteen times. For some time he held the record for most World Cup podium finishes without a win until his victory at the World Cup finals in St. Moritz in 2016. In December 2007, he fell and hurt himself in the second run after winning the first run of a race in Bad Kleinkirchheim, but finished. Two years later in December 2009, Fanara incurred a season-ending injury to his left knee after a spectacular fall during a race in Beaver Creek, two months before the 2010 Winter Olympics.

Following his World Cup win in St. Moritz, Fanara suffered an injury which kept him out of competition for the 2016-17 season. However, he subsequently made a successful return, taking a number of podium finished in his final season.

Season standings

Race podiums
 1 win – (1 GS)
 14 podiums – (14 GS) 

World championships
Fanara has competed in four World Championships in the giant slalom discipline. In 2007 in Åre, Sweden, he finished 16th, but on home country snow in 2009 in Val-d'Isère, France, he did not finish the first run. At Garmisch-Partenkirchen, Germany, he finished sixth in 2011 but failed to finish the first run in 2013 at Schladming, Austria. Fanara participated in the team event in 2011 at Garmisch and earned a gold medal.

Olympics
At the Winter Olympics, Fanara did not finish the first run of the giant slalom in 2006 and was injured two months prior the 2010 Games and did not compete.

National championships
Fanara reached the podium of French national championships four times, all in giant slalom. In 2005 he was third; in 2006 he was second; and he won in 2007 and 2009.

References

External links
 
 Thomas Fanara World Cup standings at the International Ski Federation
 
 
 French Ski Team – 2019 men's A team – ''
 Fischer Skis – alpine racing – Thomas Fanara

1981 births
French male alpine skiers
Alpine skiers at the 2006 Winter Olympics
Alpine skiers at the 2014 Winter Olympics
Alpine skiers at the 2018 Winter Olympics
Olympic alpine skiers of France
Sportspeople from Annecy
Living people
Université Savoie-Mont Blanc alumni
21st-century French people